Madly in Love (French: Fou d'amour) is a 1943 French comedy film directed by Paul Mesnier and starring Elvire Popesco, Henri Garat and Micheline Francey.

The film's sets were designed by the art director René Renoux.

Synopsis
The son of a department store owner falls in love with one of the customers. He discovers that she is the goddaughter of a professor who runs a private psychiatric hospital. In order to spend more time with her he decides to pretend to be mad and have himself admitted to the hospital as a patient.

Main cast
 Elvire Popesco as Arabella 
 Henri Garat as Claude Sauvin 
 Andrex as Ulysse 
 Julien Carette as L'homme aux mouches
 Micheline Francey as Solange Perrier 
 Marcel Vallée as Monsieur Sauvin 
 Jacques Louvigny as Le professeur Hauteclerc 
 Fred Pasquali as Le parieur 
 Sinoël as Le vieux client 
 Jean Rigaux as Le ténor 
 Paul Gobert as Le docteur Bardin 
 Viviane Gosset as Noémie 
 Marcelle Rexiane as La pudibonde 
 Simone Allain as Madame Hauteclerc

References

Bibliography 
 Holmstrom, John. The Moving Picture Boy: An International Encyclopaedia from 1895 to 1995. Michael Russell, 1996.

External links 
 

1943 films
French comedy films
1943 comedy films
1940s French-language films
Films directed by Paul Mesnier
French black-and-white films
1940s French films